Connor Scott Stanley (born 30 December 2001) is an English footballer who plays as a winger for Bamber Bridge on loan from Bolton Wanderers.

Career

Manchester United
Stanley joined the Manchester United academy in August 2018 from Birmingham City. In February 2020 he was included in United's Europa League squad.

On 2 April 2021, Stanley signed on loan with USL Championship side Atlanta United 2, who play in the second-tier of the US soccer pyramid. He made his professional debut on 16 May 2021, starting for Atlanta against OKC Energy. His loan expired and was not renewed by Atlanta following their 2021 season.

Bolton Wanderers
On 17 June 2022, it was announced Stanley would join Bolton Wanderers once his Manchester United contract expired and would join Bolton's B team. On 18 October 2022, Stanley joined Northern Premier League Premier Division club Bamber Bridge on a one-month loan deal. He scored in his first two appearances, a 1–0 win against Hyde United and a 2–1 win against Gainsborough Trinity. After the completion of his loan, he went out on loan again — this time to United of Manchester for a month. He played three times. On 4 February, he re-joined Bamber Bridge on another one month's loan.

References

External links
Player profile: Connor Stanley Manchester United profile
Connor Stanley | Atlanta United FC Atlanta United profile

2001 births
Living people
Sportspeople from Redditch
English footballers
Association football midfielders
Manchester United F.C. players
Atlanta United 2 players
Bolton Wanderers F.C. players
Bamber Bridge F.C. players
F.C. United of Manchester players
USL Championship players
English expatriate footballers
English expatriate sportspeople in the United States
Expatriate soccer players in the United States